The 17th Filipino Academy of Movie Arts and Sciences Awards Night was held on April 27, 1969, for the Outstanding Achievements for the year 1968.

Igorota, made by Nepomuceno Productions won eight Famas Awards including the FAMAS Award for Best Picture and best actress for Charito Solis.

Awards

Major Awards
Winners are listed first and highlighted with boldface.

Special Awardee

POSTHUMOUS Award 
Jess Lapid
Carlos Vander Tolosa

References

External links
FAMAS Awards 

FAMAS Award
FAMAS
FAMAS